The 2014 Argentine Primera B Nacional was the 29th season of the professional Argentine second division. A total of 22 teams competed. For this season, AFA decided to change the structure in the Argentine football league system, and because of this 10 teams were promoted to Primera División, with no relegations.

Club information

Standings

Zone A

Results

Zone A triangular
Three tied teams from Zone A will play in a triangular for two places in the Argentine Primera División. It will be played 11–19 December. Although a home and an away team is named for each match, the three matches will be played in neutral stadiums.

Results of triangular

Zone B

Results

Zone B play–off

Two tied teams from Zone B competed in a play-off match for a place in the Argentine Primera División. The match and promotion was won by Huracán.

Relegation
This season there were no relegations because of the new format. The points obtained were added for the next season.

Season statistics

Top scorers
Updated for games played 8 December 2014

See also
2014–15 in Argentine football
2014 Argentine Primera División

References

External links
List of Argentine second division champions by RSSSF

Primera B Nacional seasons
2014 in Argentine football leagues
Arg